Harwoods Hole is a cave system located in the northwest of the South Island of New Zealand, in the Abel Tasman National Park. At , it is New Zealand's deepest vertical shaft. It was first explored in 1958, long after it was discovered.

Formation 
Evidence suggests that run-off from an area of approximately 20 square km converged into a stream that then flowed down a dry valley to create what is now Harwoods Hole. Since then the river appears to have changed course. Subsequently, Harwoods Hole receives water through sinkholes and surrounding dry valleys; this water then percolates through surrounding rock ensuring it becomes saturated with calcite, before entering the cave where the calcite is deposited. This second phase means that rather than expanding, Harwoods Hole is being filled in.

History
It is one of several important cave systems in Tākaka Hill, between Golden Bay and Tasman Bay / Te Tai-o-Aorere. Starting at the surface as a  diameter entrance and descending , Harwoods Hole is New Zealand's deepest vertical shaft. Further in it connects with Starlight Cave. The long rope descent is considered one of the most spectacular parts of the caving experience at Harwoods.

Henry Harwood (1844–1927), with John Horton and Thomas Manson, opened up the Canaan Downs area and discovered Harwoods Hole, though it was not immediately entered. It remained untouched until seven cavers explored it over the 1958/59 summer. With a home-built winch weighing , the first person was lowered down on 28 December 1958. Upon completion of the initial exploration, Harwoods Hole became the deepest explored cave in New Zealand, a record that was later broken by Nettlebed Cave in the nearby Mount Arthur region.

The following summer, 21 cavers explored Harwoods Hole further. The team was also interested in finding the outflow of the underground stream. They suspected that The Gorge Creek at East Tākaka was the outlet as the flow rate matched, and green dye released inside Harwoods Hole was soon visible when it emerged at Starlight Cave, so named by the cavers where The Gorge Creek emerged. With the connection confirmed, a squeeze was widened by gelignite and a connection from Harwoods Hole to East Tākaka for cavers was thus established. On 4 January 1960, Harwoods Hole was the site of the first fatality by a member of the New Zealand Speleological Society when the leader of the caving expedition, Peter Lambert, was killed by rock fall. A cairn at the bottom of the shaft with Lambert's helmet placed on it acts as a memorial.

Access
Near the top of Tākaka Hill on State Highway 60, an unsealed side road leading to Harwoods Hole is sign-posted. After , a car park is reached. From here, a  walking track gives access to Harwoods Hole. The hole is not fenced.

References

External links
Harwoods Hole Caving Guidelines
New Zealand Speleological Society Homepage

Caves of the Tasman District
Sinkholes of Oceania